Oziroe  is a genus of bulbous South American plants in the squill subfamily within the asparagus family. Within the Scilloideae, it is the sole member of the tribe Oziroëeae and the only genus in the subfamily to be found in the New World.

Description

Species of Oziroe grow from bulbs, which have contractile roots as well as normal ones. Each bulb produces only a few leaves, which are thick and grooved. The flowering stem (scape) appears at the same time as the leaves. It has bract along its length, with generally one or two flowers on straight stalks (pedicels) appearing from the angle between each bract and the scape.

Species
, the World Checklist of Selected Plant Families recognized five species:

 Oziroe acaulis (Baker) Speta - Perú, Bolivia, Chile, Argentina
 Oziroe argentinensis (Lillo & Hauman) Speta - Bolivia, Paraguay, Argentina
 Oziroe arida (Poepp.) Speta - Chile Common name: “lagrimas de la Virgen”
 Oziroe biflora (Ruiz & Pav.) Speta - Chile, Perú, Bolivia
 Oziroe pomensis Ravenna - Perú, Bolivia, Chile, Argentina

References

Asparagaceae genera
Scilloideae
Flora of South America
Taxa named by Constantine Samuel Rafinesque